Yeon Jun Park (born January 8, 1997) is a South Korean figure skater. She is the 2011 Asian Figure Skating Trophy champion and competed at the 2013 Four Continents Championships, placing 16th.

Programs

Competitive highlights

References

External links 
 

1997 births
South Korean female single skaters
Living people
Figure skaters from Seoul